Bakhuizen (West Frisian: Bakhuzen) is a village in the Dutch province of Friesland. It is in the municipality De Fryske Marren, about 6 km east of the city of Stavoren.

Bakhuizen has about 1,075 inhabitants.

History 
The village was first mentioned in 1412 as Backhuysen. The etymology is unclear. Bakhuizen developed in the 12th or 13th century on a clay ridge. Even though it belonged to Mirns, it developed independently and became a Catholic enclave. The first church was built in 1412. The Catholic St.-Odulphus Church was built between 1913 and 1914. In 1840, it was home to 477 people.

References

External links

De Fryske Marren
Populated places in Friesland